Microblading is a tattooing technique and form of permanent makeup in which a small handheld tool made of several tiny needles is used to add semi-permanent pigment to the skin. Microblading differs from standard eyebrow tattooing, as each hairstroke is created by hand using a blade which creates fine slices in the skin, whereas eyebrow tattoos are done with a machine and single needle bundle. Microblading is typically used on eyebrows to create, enhance, or reshape their appearance in terms of both shape and color. It deposits pigment into the upper region of the dermis, so it fades more rapidly than traditional tattooing techniques, which deposit pigment deeper into the skin. 
Microblading is also sometimes called embroidery, feather touch, microstroking, 3D eyebrow embroidery, or hair-like strokes.

History

The technique of implanting pigment following fine incisions in the skin may date back thousands of years, but the trend of using the technique for eyebrows is thought to have emerged in Asia, becoming popular in Singapore and Korea as early as 2005, and in Europe and the United States in 2010. Microblading had become the most popular method of cosmetic eyebrow tattooing in Europe and the United States by 2015. Technique names such as 3D or 6D eyebrows were also popularized.

Placement and design
Microblading artists begin each appointment by discussing their client's desired look and needs before measuring and sketching out the placement of the eyebrows. Measuring brow placement is a multi-step process, that begins by determining the center of the face and the set of the client's eyes. The starting point, arch, and ending point are determined by the spacing of the eyes, such as close-set or wide-set. The artist sketches out the full brow with the appropriate thickness and arch height, to give the client a visual of what the finished brows will look like, and to set the outline for the microblading. Manual smooth shading (microshading) can also be added to go over and between the hair strokes to visually give the dimension of natural eyebrow thickness without any sharp contours on the eyebrows.

Durability
The microblading procedure is a semi-permanent tattoo. Like all tattoos, microblading can fade, depending on multiple factors, including the quality of pigment/ink used, UV exposure, elements found in skincare products, and/or medications. The treatment lasts from 18 to 30 months, although it can sometimes last for up to 3 years. A touch-up session is encouraged 6 weeks after the first microblading procedure, and every 12-18 months thereafter.

Safety
Safety precautions for microblading are similar to those for any other tattooing technique. The most common complications and client dissatisfaction that result from any form of tattooing are a misapplication of the pigment, pigment migration, colour change, and in some cases, unintended hyperpigmentation. Serious complications are uncommon. As with all forms of tattooing, the risks associated with microblading include the transmission of blood-borne pathogenic organisms (e.g., HIV, hepatitis C, staphylococcus aureus, herpes simplex), as well as short-term or long-term reactions to pigment ingredients. There is the potential for granulomas to form on the tattooed areas, as a result of the pigment, a foreign substance, being injected into the skin. Therefore, it is essential to verify that the technician holds the appropriate licenses and registrations for the provision of tattoo services, as well as inquire about the technician's standard of training. Procedures performed by technicians, who have completed a comprehensive course of instruction, can minimize the risk of unwanted outcomes and client dissatisfaction.

Microblading and nanoblading 
In recent years, the most popular style of microblading has been nanoblading. Nanoblading is a form of microblading done with thinner blades. The blades are called nano blades because they are thinner than standard microblades. Their thickness ranges between 0.15 and 0.18 mm in diameter, while microblading blades are usually 0.20 mm. As a result of this, the marks made on the eyebrows are thinner and look more natural. 

Nanoblading is often confused with nano brows, which is a slightly different form of modern-day eyebrow tattooing.

Microblading and nano brows 
The look of eyebrow microblading can also be achieved with an alternative technique called nano brows. Nano brows is a form of eyebrow tattoo where additional hair strokes are added, but they are created with an electric tattooing device used for permanent makeup. The technique is, therefore, more similar to traditional tattooing, although the results are not permanent. They last slightly longer than the results of microblading, and the technique is generally considered to be more gentle on the skin

References

Tattooing
Facial hair